Celtis madagascariensis is a species of flowering plant endemic to Madagascar.

Description
Celtis madagascariensis is a small deciduous tree, growing 7 to 10 meters high. Its bark is smooth and whitish to grey. Its leaves are alternate, simple, and ovate-elliptic, 7 – 10 cm wide by 2.5 – 3 cm wide.

Male and hermaphrodite flowers creamy with a tender glabrous pedicel, 3 to 5 mm long, with 5 glabrous sepals and 5 stamens. They are borne on axillary inflorescences, as long as or longer than the petiole, lower ones with only male flowers or with male flowers and 1 or 2 hermaphrodite flowers, and upper ones sometimes without male flowers and 2 to 5 hermaphrodite flowers. The fruit is a drupe, green becoming red or brown and broadly ellipsoid, c. 12 x 8 mm, bearing a single seed.

Range and habitat
Celtis madagascariensis is widespread in northern, western and southwestern Madagascar. It lives along forest margins, up to 1,200 meters elevation.

References

madagascariensis
Endemic flora of Madagascar